Jae'Lyn Withers (born December 20, 2000) is an American college basketball player for the Louisville Cardinals of the Atlantic Coast Conference (ACC).

High school career
Withers played basketball for North Mecklenburg High School in Huntersville, North Carolina. As a junior, he averaged 20 points and 10.1 rebounds per game, earning Charlotte Observer 4A Metro Player of the Year and I-MECK Player of the Year honors. For his senior season, he transferred to Cleveland Heights High School in Cleveland Heights, Ohio. Withers averaged 19.8 points, 9.7 rebounds and 2.2 blocks per game as a senior. He competed for Team Loaded NC on the Amateur Athletic Union circuit. A consensus four-star recruit, Withers committed to playing college basketball for Louisville over offers from Arizona, Florida, Texas and Texas A&M.

College career
Withers redshirted his first season at Louisville to focus on gaining strength and weight. On November 29, 2020, he recorded a freshman season-high 20 points and nine rebounds in an 86–64 win over Prairie View A&M. As a freshman, Withers averaged 10.1 points and 7.7 rebounds per game, earning Atlantic Coast Conference (ACC) All-Freshman Team honors.

Career statistics

College

|-
| style="text-align:left;"| 2019–20
| style="text-align:left;"| Louisville
| style="text-align:center;" colspan="11"|  Redshirt
|-
| style="text-align:left;"| 2020–21
| style="text-align:left;"| Louisville
| 20 || 20 || 25.7 || .549 || .381 || .679 || 7.7 || .5 || .9 || .4 || 10.0

Personal life
Withers was born when his father, Curtis, was 16 years old and a high school sophomore. Curtis played college basketball at Charlotte, where he was an all-conference player, before embarking on a professional career in the NBA Development League and overseas.

References

External links
Louisville Cardinals bio

2000 births
Living people
American men's basketball players
Basketball players from Charlotte, North Carolina
Small forwards
Louisville Cardinals men's basketball players
Cleveland Heights High School alumni